Alex Plat (born 4 February 1998) is a Dutch professional footballer who plays as a defensive midfielder for Eerste Divisie club NAC Breda.

Career

Volendam
Plat started playing football at RKAV Volendam, after which he moved to the youth academy of FC Volendam. He signed his first contract on 30 March 2015, on a deal until 2017 with an option for an additional season. At the end of the 2016–17 season, the option in his contract was triggered and he was extended for one year.

He made his Eerste Divisie debut for Volendam on 20 October 2017 in a game against NEC as a 71st-minute substitute for Luís Pedro. He mainly played for the reserve team, Jong Volendam in the Derde Divisie that season, winning promotion to the third-tier Tweede Divisie in May 2019.

On 8 March 2019, Plat signed a new contract with Volendam until 2020. He mainly featured as a starter the following season, making 23 appearances as a starter before the season was abandoned due to the COVID-19 pandemic. On 10 October 2019, he had signed another contract extension keeping him at Volendam until 2022.

NAC Breda
Plat joined NAC Breda on 1 July 2022 as his contract with Volendam had expired, signing a two-year contract with an option for an additional year. Plat was revealed as captain during the open day of the new season.

Career statistics

Honours
Jong Volendam
Derde Divisie – Sunday: 2018–19

References

External links

1998 births
People from Volendam
Living people
Dutch footballers
Association football midfielders
FC Volendam players
NAC Breda players
Eerste Divisie players
Derde Divisie players
Footballers from North Holland